The Wind River Formation is a geologic formation in Wyoming. It preserves fossils dating back to the Paleogene period. A recent study by Stanford suggests that fracking has contaminated the entire ground water resource in the basin.

Fossil content

Mammals

Apatotheres

Cimolestans

Leptictids

Primatomorphs

Rodents

Ungulates

Reptiles

Squamates

Invertebrates

Insects

Plants

See also

 List of fossiliferous stratigraphic units in Wyoming
 Paleontology in Wyoming

References

 

Paleogene geology of Wyoming